The following is a list of highest-grossing science fiction films of all time.

Highest-grossing sci-fi films
The following is a list of the highest-grossing science fiction films of all time. The top 13 are among the highest-grossing films of all time. Superhero films often have some science-fiction elements but are not included here, as they have their own list.

Highest-grossing films adjusted for inflation

Because of the long-term effects of inflation, notably the significant increase of movie theater ticket prices, the list unadjusted for inflation gives far more weight to later films. The unadjusted list, while commonly found in the press, is therefore largely meaningless for comparing films widely separated in time, as many films from earlier eras will never appear on a modern unadjusted list, despite achieving higher commercial success when adjusted for price increases. To compensate for the devaluation of the currency, some charts make adjustments for inflation, but not even this practice fully addresses the issue, since ticket prices and inflation do not necessarily parallel one another. For example, in 1970, tickets cost $1.55 or about $6.68 in inflation-adjusted 2004 dollars; by 1980, prices had risen to about $2.69, a drop to $5.50 in inflation-adjusted 2004 dollars. Ticket prices have also risen at different rates of inflation around the world, further complicating the process of adjusting worldwide grosses.

Another complication is release in multiple formats for which different ticket prices are charged. One notable example of this phenomenon is Avatar, which was also released in 3D and IMAX: almost two-thirds of tickets for that film were for 3D showings with an average price of $10, and about one-sixth were for IMAX showings with an average price over $14.50, compared to a 2010 average price of $7.61 for 2D films. Social and economic factors such as population change and the growth of international markets also impact on the number of people purchasing theater tickets, along with audience demographics where some films sell a much higher proportion of discounted children's tickets, or perform better in big cities where tickets cost more.

The measuring system for gauging a film's success is based on unadjusted grosses, mainly because historically this is the way it has always been done because of the practices of the film industry: the box office receipts are compiled by theaters and relayed to the distributor, which in turn releases them to the media. Converting to a more representative system that counts ticket sales rather than gross is also fraught with problems because the only data available for older films are the sale totals. As the motion picture industry is highly oriented towards marketing currently released films, unadjusted figures are always used in marketing campaigns so that new blockbuster films can much more easily achieve a high sales ranking, and thus be promoted as a "top film of all time", so there is little incentive to switch to a more robust analysis from a marketing or even newsworthy point of view.

Timeline of highest-grossing sci-fi films
Star Wars is the only franchise to hold it on multiple occasions doing so twice in 1977 and 1999, while Steven Spielberg is the only director to hold it on multiple occasions doing so twice in 1983 and 1993.

Star Wars, E.T. the Extra-Terrestrial, Jurassic Park and Avatar all became the highest grossing films of all time upon the release. Avatar briefly lost it in 2019 to Avengers: Endgame before taking it back with a 2021 re-issue.

Highest-grossing sci-fi film franchises and film series 
The following is a list of highest-grossing sci-fi film franchises and film series of all time. The top 5 are among the highest-grossing franchises of all time. Star Wars sits top with a total gross of $10.3B, while Avatar has the best average of any science fiction series at $2.6B.

Highest grossing sci-fi films by year

Highest-grossing opening weekends for sci-fi films
The following is a list of the highest worldwide openings for sci-fi films.

Box office admissions
The following is a list of sci-fi films that sold over 70 million tickets.

See also
 List of highest-grossing films

Notes

References 

Science fiction
Lists of science fiction films